The 2018–19 Stetson Hatters men's basketball team represented Stetson University during the 2018–19 NCAA Division I men's basketball season. The Hatters, led by sixth-year head coach Corey Williams, played their home games at the Edmunds Center in DeLand, Florida as members of the Atlantic Sun Conference. They finished the season 7–24 overall, 3–13 in ASUN play to finish in a tie for 8th place, but after tiebreakers, they missed the conference tournament.

Following the conclusion of the season, Stetson fired head coach Corey Williams, who finished his time at Stetson with a six season record of 58 wins and 133 losses.

Previous season 
The Hatters finished the 2017–18 season 12–20, 4–10 in ASUN play to finish in seventh place. They lost in the quarterfinals of the ASUN tournament to Lipscomb.

Roster

Schedule and results

 
|-
|-
!colspan=9 style=|Exhibition

|-
!colspan=9 style=| Regular season

|-
!colspan=9 style=| Atlantic Sun Conference regular season

References

Stetson Hatters men's basketball seasons
Stetson
Stetson Hatters
Stetson Hatters